Volume 2 is the second album by American rock band Giants in the Trees. It contains the single "Star Machine". The album was released on March 29, 2019.

Track listing

Reception
Kerrang gave the album 4/5, saying it was more cohesive than the first, and would appeal to fans of Sleater-Kinney and Emma Ruth Rundle.

References

2019 albums
Giants in the Trees albums
Albums produced by Jack Endino